The Malaysian Certificate of Identity is an international travel document issued by the Immigration Department of Malaysia to Malaysian permanent residents who are stateless.

Use
A holder of a Certificate of Identity can enter Germany and Hungary visa-free for a maximum of 90 days within a 180-day period.

References

International travel documents
Government of Malaysia